Prison Warden is a 1949 American film noir crime film directed by Seymour Friedman and starring Warner Baxter, Anna Lee and Harlan Warde.

Main cast
 Warner Baxter as Warden Victor Burnell 
 Anna Lee as Elisa Pennington Burnell 
 Harlan Warde as Albert Gardner 
 James Flavin as Guard Capt. Peter Butler 
 Charles Cane as Quarry Supervisor Captain Bill Radford 
 Reginald Sheffield as English Charlie / Watkins the Butler
 Heinie Conklin as Toulouse, the Cook

References

Bibliography
 Blottner, Gene. Columbia Noir: A Complete Filmography, 1940-1962. McFarland, 2015.

External links
 

1949 films
1940s thriller drama films
American thriller drama films
Films directed by Seymour Friedman
Columbia Pictures films
American black-and-white films
1949 drama films
1940s English-language films
1940s American films